Daniel Talia (born 2 October 1991) is a former professional Australian rules football player who played for the Adelaide Football Club in the Australian Football League (AFL). He was drafted with selection 13 in the 2009 National Draft from the Calder Cannons. In 2012 he won the AFL Rising Star award as the best young player in the league. Talia is the great-grandson of former  player Arthur Stevens, and the grandson of Harvey Stevens who played in Footscray's 1954 VFL Grand Final victory. His younger brother, Michael Talia, played for the  before being traded to the Sydney Swans after the 2015 season.

Pre-AFL career
Talia played junior football for Greenvale and Assumption College in Kilmore, which boasts a strong football history. He played centre-half forward for the Calder Cannons and in defence for Victoria Metro in the 2009 AFL Under-18 Championships, for which he was selected in the U18 All-Australian team. He missed the second half of the 2009 season due to a hamstring injury.

AFL career
After one and a half years on Adelaide's list, Talia made his AFL debut in round 15 of the 2011 season and held his place in the side for the rest of the season, playing nine games in total. He achieved this despite carrying an Achilles injury throughout the season, and was rewarded with the Mark Bickley award for the Crows' best first or second year player.

Talia had a breakout year in 2012. With the departure of Nathan Bock and Phil Davis in the last two seasons, and with Ben Rutten ageing, he regularly played on the opposition's best forward with great success, contributing to the club's unexpected run to the preliminary finals. Talia was nominated for the 2012 AFL Rising Star award for his shut-down effort on 's Nick Riewoldt in round 12, and at the end of the season was voted the winner of the award. His season came to a heartbreaking end when he broke his arm in Adelaide's Qualifying Final loss to the Sydney Swans. Prior to the 2013 season, Talia extended his contract for three more years, that kept him at Adelaide until the end of 2016.

Talia continued to deliver in 2013, leading the club in spoils and intercept possessions, and conceding only one goal per game despite being opposed to the opposition's leading forward. He finished equal third in the club best and fairest in 2013. In 2014 Talia added another dimension to his game, increasing his attacking output while remaining miserly in defence. He was rewarded with the Malcolm Blight Medal for the club's best and fairest player, and was also named at full-back in the All-Australian team for 2014. He continued to perform reliably in 2015, finishing in the top 10 of the club champion count and becoming the youngest member of Adelaide's leadership group. The pair were subsequently cleared.

On 24 February 2016, Talia re-signed with the Crows until the end of 2021.

In the opening round of the 2017 season, Talia was penalized for pushing the ball across the goal line from outside of the goal square in a stricter interpretation of the deliberately rushed behind rule than had been applied in previous seasons. Though Crows fans jeered at the decision, coach Don Pyke said that it was the correct interpretation. In the Crows’ round five match against  Talia limped from the ground with a hamstring injury barely a minute into the game. The Crows went on to win the game by 67 points regardless. Later in the week, scans showed that there was no serious injury and was able to play the next round. In round 18 Talia effected 16 spoils, the most out of anyone in the league in that round, and the next week he broke his own club record for the most one-percenters in a match, getting 17. After round 19 he had more spoils (154) and had won more one-on-one contests (34) than any player in the league.

Near the end of the season in a match against , Talia suffered an ankle injury, which resulted in his omission from the Crows’ final match of the home and away season against .

In August 2021, Talia was not offered a contract by Adelaide for the 2022 season and was delisted at the conclusion of the 2021 season.

Statistics
 Statistics are correct to end of 2021 season

|-  
! scope="row" style="text-align:center" | 2011
| style="text-align:center" | 
| 12 || 9 || 0 || 0 || 59 || 51 || 110 || 27 || 31 || 0.0 || 0.0 || 6.6 || 5.7 || 12.2 || 3.0 || 3.4
|-
! scope="row" style="text-align:center" | 2012
| style="text-align:center" | 
| 12 || 23 || 1 || 2 || 107 || 79 || 186 || 60 || 41 || 0.0 || 0.1 || 4.7 || 3.4 || 8.1 || 2.6 || 1.8
|- 
! scope="row" style="text-align:center" | 2013
| style="text-align:center" | 
| 12 || 22 || 3 || 0 || 143 || 103 || 246 || 93 || 35 || 0.1 || 0.0 || 6.5 || 4.7 || 11.2 || 4.2 || 1.6
|-
! scope="row" style="text-align:center" | 2014
| style="text-align:center" | 
| 12 || 22 || 0 || 1 || 167 || 93 || 260 || 105 || 24 || 0.0 || 0.1 || 7.6 || 4.2 || 11.8 || 4.8 || 1.1
|-  
! scope="row" style="text-align:center" | 2015
| style="text-align:center" | 
| 12 || 22 || 1 || 0 || 152 || 81 || 233 || 81 || 37 || 0.1 || 0.0 || 6.9 || 3.9 || 10.6 || 3.7 || 1.7
|-
! scope="row" style="text-align:center" | 2016
| style="text-align:center" | 
| 12 || 24 || 1 || 0 || 208 || 166 || 374 || 143 || 45 || 0.0 || 0.0 || 8.7 || 6.9 || 15.6 || 6.0 || 1.9
|-  
! scope="row" style="text-align:center" | 2017
| style="text-align:center" | 
| 12 || 24 || 0 || 0 || 146 || 154 || 30 || 101 || 45 || 0.0 || 0.0 || 6.1 || 6.4 || 12.5 || 4.2 || 1.9
|-
! scope="row" style="text-align:center" | 2018
| style="text-align:center" | 
| 12 || 18 || 0 || 0 || 139 || 119 || 258 || 92 || 37 || 0.0 || 0.0 || 7.7 || 6.6 || 14.3 || 5.1 || 2.1
|- 
! scope="row" style="text-align:center" | 2019
| style="text-align:center" | 
| 12 || 22 || 0 || 0 || 171 || 97 || 268 || 120 || 48 || 0.0 || 0.0 || 7.8 || 4.4 || 12.2 || 5.5 || 2.2
|- 
| scope=row | 2020 ||  || 12
| 14 || 0 || 0 || 83 || 41 || 124 || 47 || 15 || 0.0 || 0.0 || 5.9 || 2.9 || 8.9 || 3.4 || 1.1 
|- 
| scope=row | 2021 ||  || 12
| 0 || — || — || — || — || — || — || — || — || — || — || — || — || — || — 
|- class="sortbottom"
! colspan=3| Career
! 200
! 6
! 3
! 1375
! 984
! 2359
! 869
! 358
! 0.0
! 0.0
! 6.9
! 4.9
! 11.8
! 4.3
! 1.8
|}

Notes

Honours and achievements
Individual
All-Australian: 2014 2016
Malcolm Blight Medal (Adelaide F.C. Best & Fairest): 2014
AFL Rising Star Award: 2012
22 Under 22 team: 2012, 2013, 2014

References

External links

1991 births
Australian rules footballers from Victoria (Australia)
Living people
Adelaide Football Club players
Calder Cannons players
AFL Rising Star winners
Greenvale Football Club players
All-Australians (AFL)
Malcolm Blight Medal winners
Australian people of Italian descent